Langley is an unincorporated community in  Floyd County, Kentucky, United States. It corresponds to the Maytown census-designated place.

References

Unincorporated communities in Floyd County, Kentucky
Unincorporated communities in Kentucky